The 2012 Superstars Series Valencia round was the second round of the 2011 Superstars Series season. It took place on 8 May at the Circuit Ricardo Tormo.

Andrea Bertolini won the first race, starting from pole position, driving a Maserati Quattroporte and Luigi Ferrara gained the second one, driving a Mercedes C63 AMG.

Classification

Qualifying

Notes:
  – Sergio Hernández was given a two-place grid penalty for an irregular rear wing.

Race 1

Notes:
  – Francesco Sini was given a 25-second penalty for causing a collision with Riccardo Romagnoli.

Race 2

Standings after the event

International Series standings

Teams' Championship standings

 Note: Only the top five positions are included for both sets of drivers' standings.

References

Superstars
Superstars Series seasons